The Rio Grande Bridge at Radium Springs is a historic timber beam bridge built in 1933. It was listed on the National Register of Historic Places in 1997.

In Google Streetview imagery captured May 2018, and in Google satellite view, the bridge is unused except by pedestrians, and is seen immediately adjacent to a modern replacement bridge.

It was described by David Kammer in its 1997 NRHP nomination as a 19-span timber beam bridge, crossing the "Rio Grande as it flows in a now well-defined channel some forty miles below Elephant Butte and
Caballo Dams. / The substructure consists of 18 creosote-treated timber
piers, or bents, each containing seven piles stiffened with
diagonal timbers, or sways. The bents measure approximately 12
feet from the waterway to the deck. Timber abutments, protected
by steel bulkheads, are located beneath each of the approaches.
The superstructure consists of 19 spans, each measuring 25 feet
in length. The deck, consisting of a 2" x 4"  timbers with an
asphalt surface, rests on steel stringers. The roadway is 475
feet long and 29 feet wide and is flanked by timber felloes. The
bridge's timber rails are lined with metal guardrails."

References

External links

Wooden bridges in New Mexico
Beam bridges
National Register of Historic Places in Doña Ana County, New Mexico
Buildings and structures completed in 1933